, also known as , is a Japanese professional basketball player for Hiroshima Dragonflies of the B.League.

Early life
Enomoto was born in Okinawa to a Japanese mother, Fusako, and an American father, James, who was stationed there while serving in the Air Force. He moved to Misawa and Anchorage, Alaska before settling in Arizona during his sophomore season of high school.

College career
Enomoto considered joining the Air Force before deciding to attend Pima Community College. As a sophomore, he led the Aztecs to an NJCAA Division II runner-up finish. Enomato averaged 15.9 points and 4.1 rebounds per game and was selected first team All-ACCAC. Following the season, he transferred to Eastern New Mexico. In his two seasons at Eastern News Mexico, he averaged 8.1 points, 2.9 rebounds and 1.5 assists per game.

Professional career

Hiroshima Dragonflies (2020–present)
On June 29, 2020, Enomoto signed his first professional contract, a one-year deal, with Hiroshima Dragonflies of the B.League. He played in all 55 games, made 44 starts, averaging 9.5 points, 2.6 rebounds, 2.1 assists and 1.0 steals per game game while shooting 39.5 percent from the field and 31.0 percent from three. After an impressive rookie campaign, he was named to the B.League Best Five Rookies. 

On May 13, 2021, Enomoto re-signed with the team for another season.

National team career
After Enomoto's mother sent a highlight reel to the national team assistant coaches, he was invited to a tryout where he made the cut. Enomoto first represented Japan at the 2017 FIBA Under-19 Basketball World Cup, where he averaged 3.7 points, 2.9 rebounds and 1.1 assists per game. His tournament highlights included a 12-point and 8-rebound outing in a loss to Italy.

References

External links
 Career stastistics from basketballnavi.com
 Eastern New Mexico Greyhounds bio
 Isaiah Murphy at the 2017 FIBA Under-19 Basketball World Cup at fiba.basketball
 

1998 births
Living people
Pima Community College alumni
Eastern New Mexico Greyhounds men's basketball players
Junior college men's basketball players in the United States
Guards (basketball)
Hiroshima Dragonflies players
Japanese expatriate basketball people in the United States
Japanese men's basketball players
Japanese people of American descent
Sportspeople from Okinawa Prefecture